Kashi (also Romanized as Kāshī) is a village in Piveshk Rural District, Lirdaf District, Jask County, Hormozgan Province, Iran. At the 2006 census, its population was 557, in 134 families.

References 

Populated places in Jask County